Moon Nam-sook ( is a South Korean voice actress who joined the Munhwa Broadcasting Corporation's voice acting division in 2002.

Roles

Broadcast TV
24 (extra guest, Korea TV Edition, MBC)
CSI: Crime Scene Investigation (extra guest, Korea TV Edition, MBC)
CSI: Miami (extra guest, Korea TV Edition, MBC)
iCarly (Nickelodeon) - Samantha Puckett
Super Wings (EBS) - Jett
Tayo the Little Bus - Tayo
The Amazing Adrenalini Brothers (Cartoon Network, Korea TV Edition)
The Powerpuff Girls (Cartoon Network) - Buttercup

Movie Dubbing
Con Air (replacing Monica Potter, Korea TV Edition, MBC)
Underworld (replacing Sophia Miles, Korea TV Edition, MBC)
Chicago (replacing Lucy Liu, Korea TV Edition, MBC)
Bumblebee (replacing Hailee Steinfeld, in-flight)
Tayo the Little Bus - Tayo
Doraemon

See also
MBC Voice Acting Division

Homepage
 Daum Cafe Voice Actor Moon Nam-sook
 MBC Voice Acting division Moon Nam-sook's blog

Living people
South Korean voice actresses
1976 births